Ciuciulea is a village in Glodeni District, Moldova.

References

Villages of Glodeni District